The Caravelas River is a river that enters the Atlantic Ocean in the south of the state of Bahia, Brazil.
The community of Caravelas is on the left shore of the river a few kilometres above its mouth.

The river flows through the Cassurubá Extractive Reserve, a  sustainable use conservation unit that protects an area of mangroves, river and sea where shellfish are harvested.

See also
List of rivers of Bahia

References

Rivers of Bahia